Marie-Madeleine may refer to:
 people
Marie-Madeleine Lachenais (1778–1843), de facto Haitian politician
 Marie-Madeleine, the pen name of Gertrud von Puttkamer (1881–1944), German writer of lesbian erotica
Marie-Madeleine Gauthier (1920–1998), French medieval art historian and author
Marie-Madeleine Guimard (1743–1816), French ballerina
Marie-Madeleine Fourcade (1909–1989), the leader of the French Resistance network "Alliance"
Marie-Madeleine de Chauvigny de la Peltrie (1603–1671), Frenchwoman who helped to establish the Ursuline Order in Quebec
Marie Madeleine de Rochechouart de Mortemart (1645–1704), French abbess, better known as Gabrielle de Rochechouart

 places
Sainte-Marie-Madeleine, Quebec, parish municipality in southwestern Quebec, Canada
Église Sainte-Marie-Madeleine, Roman Catholic church in Paris

See also 
Magdalena lugens, H.343 & H.343 a, motet by Marc-Antoine Charpentier (1686 - 87)
Marie-Magdeleine, oratorio (Drame Sacré) in three acts and four parts by Jules Massenet to a French libretto by Louis Gallet
Mary Magdalene
Maria-Magdalena (disambiguation)
Maria Maddalena (disambiguation)

Compound given names
French feminine given names
de:Maria Magdalena (Begriffsklärung)
es:María Magdalena (desambiguación)
fr:Marie-Madeleine
it:Maria Magdalena
ru:Мария Магдалина (значения)